Jesse, also known as 'Isa Khan Gorji ( 1527 – 1580) was a Georgian prince of the royal house of Kakheti, whose career flourished in the service of the Safavid dynasty of Iran and included several years as a governor of Shaki in what is today Azerbaijan.

Early life 
Jesse was a son of King Leon of Kakheti by his first wife Tinatin Gurieli. As a young prince, Jesse was placed by his father at the head of the Georgian auxiliaries requested by the Safavid shah Tahmasp I during his war with the Ottoman Empire (1532–55). After the conclusion of the peace, Jesse was left as a hostage in Iran, where he converted to Islam and became known as 'Isa Khan Gorji. In 1558 or 1560 he was made by Shah Tahmasp I governor of Shaki, a Muslim city close to the border of his homeland. At his investiture, he was also elevated to the rank of farzand ("son") by the Safavid king. Jesse could have been an unnamed Georgian prince reported by the English explorer Anthony Jenkinson as attending his audience with Shah Tahmasp on 20 November 1562. Alternatively, the Georgian prince is identified with Daud Khan, brother of King Simon I of Kartli.

Career in the Safavid service 
In 1576, 'Isa Khan became embroiled in a power struggle following the death of Shah Tahmasp. He was part of the Kazvin-based Georgian faction, including Tahmasp's Georgian widow Zahra Baji, a Shalikashvili princess, which tried to secure the succession for Tahmasp's younger son Heidar. But a rival faction, dominated by the Sunni nobles, had Heidar murdered at Kazvin and placed Ismail II on the throne. According to the 17th-century historian, Iskandar Beg Munshi, 'Isa Khan was imprisoned together with another Georgian, Simon I of Kartli, at Alamut, and was liberated with him by Shah Ismail. Munshi may have confused him with Archil, son of Bagrat, Prince of Mukhrani. On the accession of Shah Mohammed Khodabanda in 1578, 'Isa Khan was again in favor. Together with Simon and yet another Georgian, Shah Rustam the Lur, he was present at the coronation of Khodabanda and the three received the honor of kissing the shah's feet. 'Isa Khan's allegiance to the Safavids was cemented, in 1578, by his marriage to a daughter of 'Abu'l Nasir Sam Mirza, Shah Tahmasp I's half-brother and Ismail I's son, by his wife, a daughter of  Husain Khan-e Shamlu. That same year, 'Isa Khan had to take flight before the Ottoman army of Lala Kara Mustafa Pasha. He then returned to Christianity and fled to his homeland, where died shortly thereafter, in 1580.

Children 
Jesse had four children:

 Prince Bagrat (died after 1607), a prisoner of the Safavids for twenty years (1580–1600), he thereafter departed for Russia, where he was living as Prince Pankrati Yesseyevich Gruzinsky as of 1607. 
 Prince Mahmad-Mirza (fl. 1580). 
 Prince Khosro (died after 1574).
 An anonymous daughter (fl. 1605).

Ancestry

References

Sources
 
  
 

1520s births
1580 deaths
Bagrationi dynasty of the Kingdom of Kakheti
Georgian princes
Iranian people of Georgian descent
Converts to Eastern Orthodoxy from Shia Islam
Safavid governors of Shaki
16th-century people of Safavid Iran